Sandra Reichel (born 24 June 1971) is an Austrian sports administrator and former professional tennis player.

Reichel competed on the professional tour in the late 1980s and early 1990s. Her WTA Tour appearances include three main draw entries in her native Linz. She had career high rankings of 449 in singles and 232 for doubles.

A sports manager by profession, Reichel has served as tournament director of several tournaments on both the men's and women's circuits, most recently the Hamburg European Open and Upper Austria Ladies Linz.

ITF finals

Doubles: 3 (0–3)

References

External links
 
 

1971 births
Living people
Austrian female tennis players
Sportspeople from Linz